Film Culture was an American film magazine started by Adolfas Mekas and his brother Jonas Mekas in 1954. The publication's headquarters were in New York City. Best known for exploring the avant-garde cinema in depth, it also published articles on other aspects of cinema, including Hollywood films.

Articles from Film Culture are compiled in a book entitled Film Culture Reader, published by Cooper Square Press.

Film Culture ceased publication 1996. During its existence the magazine produced 79 issues and issue 80 was published shortly before Mekas’ death in 2018.

Film awards 
The magazine presented awards to independent film makers:
 First Independent Film Award: John Cassavetes for Shadows (1959)
 Second Independent Film Award: Robert Frank and Alfred Leslie for Pull My Daisy (1960)
 Third Independent Film Award: Ricky Leacock, Don Pennebaker, Robert Drew and Al Maysles for Primary (1961)
 Fourth Independent Film Award: Stan Brakhage for The Dead and Prelude (1962)
 Fifth Independent Film Award: Jack Smith for Flaming Creatures (1963)
 Sixth Independent Film Award: Andy Warhol for Sleep, Haircut, Eat, Kiss and Empire (1964)
 Seventh Independent Film Award: Harry Smith for his entire body of work (1965)
 Eighth Independent Film Award: Gregory Markopoulos for his entire body of work (1966)
 Ninth Independent Film Award: Michael Snow for Wavelength (1968)
 Tenth Independent Film Award: Kenneth Anger for Invocation of My Demon Brother (1969)

References

External links
 Selections from FILM CULTURE Magazine (1955-1996) on UBUWEB

Film magazines published in the United States
Defunct magazines published in the United States
Experimental film
Magazines established in 1954
Magazines disestablished in 1996
Magazines published in New York City
Jonas Mekas